Carles ("Carlos") Costa Masferrer (born 22 April 1968) is a former professional tennis player from Spain. Costa turned professional in 1988. He was among the game's leading clay court players in the early 1990s.

Costa was runner-up at the 1992 Italian Open, and reached the fourth round at that year's French Open and US Open. Additionally, Costa won the Barcelona Open, a tournament hosted by the tennis club where he grew up. In May 1992, he reached his career-high singles ranking of World No. 10. Costa retired in 1999. 

In April 2006 he played in the 2006 Seniors Torneo Godó event in Barcelona where he lost to Sergi Bruguera in the final.

Costa worked for IMG as an agent of most male Spanish tennis players (including Rafael Nadal). A few years later, Costa left IMG and created his own sports agency company with Rafael Nadal. 

He is not related to his compatriot Albert Costa.

Career finals

Singles: 13 (6 wins – 7 losses)

Singles performance timeline

Career ITF finals

Singles
Wins (7)

External links 
 
 
 

Tennis players from Catalonia
Olympic tennis players of Spain
Spanish expatriate sportspeople in Andorra
Spanish male tennis players
Tennis players from Barcelona
Tennis players at the 1996 Summer Olympics
1968 births
Living people